Marisora berengerae, also known commonly as the San Andrés mabuya and the San Andrés skink, is a species of lizard in the family Scincidae. The species is endemic to San Andrés, an island in the southwestern Caribbean.

Etymology
The specific name, berengerae, is in honor of Bérengère Miralles who is the wife Aurélien Miralles, the describer of this species.

Habitat

Behavior
M. berengerae is arboreal and has been found high in palms and other trees.

Reproduction
M. berengerae is viviparous.

References

Further reading
Caicedo JR (2014). "Redescubrimiento de Mabuya berengerae, Mabuya pergravis (Squamata: Scincidae) y Coniophanes andresensis (Squamata: Colubridae) y evaluación de su estado de amenaza en las islas de San Andrés y Providencia, Colombia [Rediscovery of Mabuya berengerae, Mabuya pergravis (Squamata: Scincidae) and Coniophanes andresensis (Squamata: Colubridae), and assessment of its threatened status in the San Andrés and Providencia Islands, Colombia]". Caldasia 36 (1): 181–201. (in Spanish).
Hedges SB, Conn CE (2012). "A new skink fauna from Caribbean islands (Squamata, Mabuyidae, Mabuyinae)". Zootaxa 3288: 1–244. (Alinea berengerae, new combination).
Miralles A (2006). "A new species of Mabuya (Reptilia, Squamata, Scincidae) from the Caribbean Island of San Andrés, with a new interpretation of nuchal scales: A character of taxonomic importance". Herpetological Journal 16 (1): 1–7. (Mabuya berengerae, new species).

Marisora
Reptiles described in 2006
Taxa named by Aurélien Miralles